Michael John Lansford (born July 20, 1958) is a former National Football League (NFL) placekicker from 1982–1990 for the Los Angeles Rams. In 1989, he led the league with 51 extra points.  He is one of seven barefooted kickers in NFL history.  

Lansford was known more for accuracy and being a clutch kicker than he was for a strong leg. He was only 4 of 17 in his career on field goal attempts of 50 yards or more, but was successful on nearly 75% of his attempts inside 45 yards. In addition, he never missed a last minute game tying or winning field goal. His 42-yard field goal in New Orleans in the final moments of the 1983 season's final game gave the Rams a 26–24 win over the Saints and sent the Rams to the playoffs over the Saints. In 1989, he kicked a last second field goal in San Francisco to beat the 49ers 13–12, and in the 1989 NFC divisional playoff game, he made 2 fourth-quarter field goals in a swirling wind at the Meadowlands to enable the Rams to tie the Giants in a game the Rams eventually won in overtime. 

He also made last minute field goals to beat the Cardinals in 1984, the 49ers in 1986, the Bears in 1986 (a 50 yarder), and the Cardinals in 1987, as well as an overtime winner vs. the Saints in 1989. 

As of 2021, Lansford's 789 career points ranks 97th all-time in NFL scoring.

Family
Lansford married Teresa Nelleson  1984/1985. He later married Jill Haus-Lansford.

References

1958 births
Living people
People from Greater Los Angeles
American football placekickers
Washington Huskies football players
Los Angeles Rams players
National Football League replacement players